Shapur cave/ Shapour cave is located in the Zagros Mountains, in southern Iran, about 6 km from the ancient city of Bishapur. This cave is near Kazerun in the Chogan valley, which was the site of polo (Persian čōgān چُوگان), in the Sasanian period.

In the cave, on the fourth of five terraces, stands the statue of Shapur I, the second ruler of the Sasanid Empire. The statue was carved from one stalagmite. The height of statue is 7 metres and its shoulders are 2 m wide, and its arms are 3 m long.

About 1400 years ago, after the Muslim conquest of Persia and collapse of the Sasanian Empire, the statue was pulled down and a part of one of its legs was broken. About 70 years ago, again, parts of his arms were also broken in an earthquake. The statue had been lying on the ground for about 14 centuries until 1957 when Mohammad Reza Pahlavi, the last Shah of Iran, had a group of Iranian military to raise it again on its feet and repair the broken foot with iron and cement. The project of raising the statue, building the roads from Bishapur to the area and paths in the mountain, stairs and iron fences on the route to the cave took six months in 1957.

The length of cave entrance is about 16 metres, with a height of less than 8 m. Behind the statue, in the depth of the cave, are three ancient water-basins. At both sides of the statue, the rock-walls of the cave were prepared for reliefs by leveling, but the reliefs were never made.  It is said that in addition to the Shapur I statue the tomb of Shapur I is also located somewhere in this cave. Another legend holds that Shapur, being defeated in a battle, ran into this cave and became lost and his body/remains have never been recovered.

There are two inscriptions in the cave, one translates Shapur's own inscription on the Naqsh-e Rajab. The other is about the restoration of the statue by the army.

Gallery

See also 
 Sasanid architecture
 Naqsh-e Rustam

References

Shapur I
Caves of Iran
Show caves in Iran
Sasanian architecture
Tourist attractions in Fars Province
Kazerun County
Landforms of Fars Province